Adlington is a civil parish in Lancashire, England. It contains twelve buildings that are recorded in the National Heritage List for England as designated listed buildings, all of which are designated at Grade II. This grade is the lowest of the three gradings given to listed buildings and is applied to "buildings of national importance and special interest". The parish contains the small town of Adlington, which is surrounded by countryside. The listed buildings in the town consist of a row of three cottages, an active church, a redundant church, and a former school and master's house. Outside the town, the listed buildings are mainly houses, farmhouses, and farm buildings. The Leeds and Liverpool Canal runs through the parish, and two bridges crossing it and an aqueduct carrying it over a river are listed.

Buildings

References
Citations

Sources

Buildings and structures in the Borough of Chorley
Lists of listed buildings in Lancashire
Listed buildings in